Princess Nariratana (17 August 1861 – 16 June 1925) was a Princess of Siam (later Thailand She was a member of Siamese royal family is a daughter of King Mongkut and Consort Duangkham and was Thai-Laos descent.

Her Mother was Chao Chom Manda Duangkham (is a granddaughter of King Anouvong of Vientiane), She had one sister was Princess Pradidhasari.

Princess Nariratana died on 16 June 1925 at the age 63.

Ancestors

Royal decoration
  Dame Grand Commander (Second Class) of The Most Illustrious Order of Chula Chom Klao
  King Rama IV Royal Cypher Medal (Second Class)
  King Rama V Royal Cypher Medal (2nd Class)
  Ratana Varabhorn Order of Merit

References 

1861 births
1925 deaths
19th-century Thai women
19th-century Chakri dynasty
20th-century Thai women
20th-century Chakri dynasty
Thai female Phra Ong Chao
People from Bangkok
Thai people of Laotian descent
Children of Mongkut
Daughters of kings